Xiangfang District is one of nine districts of the prefecture-level city of Harbin, the capital of Heilongjiang Province, Northeast China. It is an urban district in the pre-1940 part of Harbin, bordering the districts of Daowai to the north, Acheng to the southeast, Pingfang to the southwest, and Nangang to the west. It is an industrialized area, and contains the main scientific, technological and industrial zones of the city. The Harbin Development Zone is in the district.

Administrative divisions
On 15 August 2006, Dongli District was merged into Xiangfang District, thus adding Chaoyang Town.

The current subdistricts are: 

The current towns are:

Notes

External links
  - 

Xiangfang